Paraburkholderia fungorum (P. fungorum) is a Gram-negative species of bacteria. that has been commonly used as a beneficial microorganism in agriculture as an agent for biocontrol and bioremediation. Paraburkholderia fungorum is Some of its strains can use uranium for their growth and convert U(VI) to U(IV).

Methodology

The pangolin P. fungorum (pangolin Pf) genome has a genomic size of approximately 7.7 Mbps with N50 of 69,666 bps. It has been shown that pangolin Pf is a Paraburkholderia fungorum evidence from the core genome SNP-based phylogenetic analysis and the ANI analysis supported via Functional analysis has shown that the presence of a considerably large number of genes related to stress response, virulence, disease, and defence. Different types of secretion systems have been identified in the genome of pangolin Pf, which are highly specialized and responsible for a bacterium’s response to its environment and in physiological processes such as survival, adhesion, and adaptation.

The pangolin Pf also shared some common virulence genes with the known pathogenic member of the Burkholderiales. These genes play important roles in adhesion, motility, and invasion.The addition of this genome sequence is also important for future comparative analysis and functional work of P. fungorum.

See also 

 Shewanella putrefaciens
 Geobacter metallireducens

References

fungorum
Bacteria described in 2001